The 2019 Women's Rugby Super Series was the third series of the Women's Rugby Super Series, a women's international rugby union competition featuring the best-ranked sides. Unlike the previous editions of the Super Series in 2015 and 2016 which featured four teams, the 2019 edition featured five. The teams were the top five ranked in the world, hosts the United States, defending champions Canada,  2016 debutants France, Six Nations Grand Slam champions and two-time runners-up England, and 2015 champions and current world champions New Zealand. The tournament was won by New Zealand with England second and France third.

Table

Fixtures

28 June

2 July

6 July

10 July

14 July

See also
Women's international rugby

References

Women's Rugby Super Series
International women's rugby union competitions hosted by the United States
2019 rugby union tournaments for national teams
2019 in women's rugby union
2019 in American rugby union
2019 in Canadian rugby union
2019 in New Zealand rugby union
2018–19 in English rugby union
2018–19 in French rugby union
2019 in American women's sports
2019 in Canadian women's sports
2019 in New Zealand women's sport
2019 in English women's sport
2019 in French women's sport
June 2019 sports events in the United States
July 2019 sports events in the United States